Raymond Ovinou (born 6 September 1984 in Port Moresby) is a Papua New Guinean judoka. At the 2012 Summer Olympics he competed in the Men's 66 kg, but was defeated in the second round.  At the 2014 Commonwealth Games, he reached the last 16. At the 2016 Summer Olympics, he competed in the Men's 66 kg, but was defeated by Antoine Bouchard in the first round.

References

External links 
 

Papua New Guinean male judoka
Living people
1984 births
Olympic judoka of Papua New Guinea
Judoka at the 2012 Summer Olympics
Judoka at the 2016 Summer Olympics
People from the National Capital District (Papua New Guinea)
Judoka at the 2014 Commonwealth Games
Commonwealth Games competitors for Papua New Guinea